Amara torrida is a species of seed-eating ground beetle in the family Carabidae. It is found in North America, temperate Asia, and Europe.

References

Further reading

 

torrida
Articles created by Qbugbot
Beetles described in 1796